The Proust Questionnaire is a set of questions answered by the French writer Marcel Proust, and often used by modern interviewers.

Proust answered the questionnaire in a confession album—a form of parlor game popular among Victorians. The album belonged to his friend Antoinette, daughter of future French President Félix Faure, titled "An Album to Record Thoughts, Feelings, etc."

The album was found in 1924 by Faure's son, and published in the French literary journal Les Cahiers du Mois. It was auctioned on May 27, 2003 for the sum of €102,000 ($113,609.46USD).

Other historical figures who have answered confession albums are Oscar Wilde, Karl Marx, Arthur Conan Doyle, Stéphane Mallarmé, Paul Cézanne, Martin Boucher and Enzo Kehl.

The French book talk show host Bernard Pivot used a similar questionnaire at the end of every episode of his show Apostrophes. Inspired by Bernard Pivot, James Lipton,  the host of the TV program Inside the Actors Studio, used a similar questionnaire. Lipton had often incorrectly characterized the questionnaire itself as an invention of Pivot.

A similar questionnaire is regularly seen on the back page of Vanity Fair magazine, answered by various celebrities. In October 2009, Vanity Fair launched an interactive version of the questionnaire, that compares individual answers to those of various luminaries.

Another version of the questionnaire, as answered by various Canadian authors, is a regular feature on the radio program The Next Chapter.

The questionnaire

There are two surviving sets of answers to the confession album questions by Proust: the first, from 1885 or 1886, is to an English confessions album, although his answers are in French. The second, from 1891 or 1892, is from a French album, Les confidences de salon ("Drawing room confessions"), which contains translations of the original questions, lacking some that were in the English version and adding others.

Notes

Related links
 Responses to the questionnaire by Antoinette Faure
 Answer Vanity Fair's Interactive Proust Questionnaire and compare your results
 Answer the Proust Questionnaire

Polling
Marcel Proust